Rachoula may refer to several places in Greece:

Rachoula, Karditsa, a village in the municipal unit of Itamos, Karditsa regional unit
Rachoula, Larissa, a village in the municipal unit of Koilada, Larissa regional unit